The following lists events that happened during 2018 in New Zealand.

Population
 Estimated population as of 31 December 2018 – 4,886,100
 Increase since 31 December 2017 – 80,700 (1.68%)
 Males per 100 females – 96.8

Incumbents

Regal and vice-regal
Head of State – Elizabeth II
Governor-General – Patsy Reddy

Government
2018 is the first full year of the 52nd Parliament, which first sat on 7 November 2017.

The Sixth Labour Government, elected in 2017, continues.

Speaker of the House – Trevor Mallard
Prime Minister – Jacinda Ardern
Deputy Prime Minister – Winston Peters
Leader of the House – Chris Hipkins
Minister of Finance – Grant Robertson
Minister of Foreign Affairs – Winston Peters

Other party leaders
National – Bill English until 27 February, then Simon Bridges (Leader of the Opposition)
New Zealand First – Winston Peters
Green  –  James Shaw and, from 8 April, Marama Davidson
ACT New Zealand – David Seymour

Judiciary
Chief Justice – Sian Elias

Main centre leaders
Mayor of Auckland – Phil Goff
Mayor of Tauranga – Greg Brownless
Mayor of Hamilton – Andrew King
Mayor of Wellington – Justin Lester
Mayor of Christchurch – Lianne Dalziel
Mayor of Dunedin – Dave Cull

Events

February 

 3 February - Murder of Amber-Rose Rush, a Dunedin teenager. A doctor named Venod Skantha is charged with her murder.

March 

 6 March – The 2018 New Zealand census is held.

May 

 17 May – The 2018 New Zealand budget is presented to Parlimanet by the Minister of Finance, Grant Robertson.

June 

 4 June – The 2018 Queen's Birthday Honours are announced.
 9 June – The Northcote by-election is won by National, who retain the seat.

August
 15 August – Parliament passes the Overseas Investment Amendment Act 2018, which bans the sale of existing homes to most non-resident foreigners

December 

 1 or 2 December – Murder of Grace Millane, a British tourist. A 26-year-old man is charged with her murder on 8 December.
 31 December – The 2019 New Year Honours are announced.

Sport

Commonwealth Games
 
 New Zealand sends a team of 253 competitors in 17 sports.

Olympic Games

 New Zealand sends a team of 21 competitors in five sports.

Paralympic Games

 New Zealand sends a team of three competitors in two sports.

Sailing
 24 February – 18 March: Auckland is a stopover on the 2017–18 Volvo Ocean Race

Shooting
Ballinger Belt – John Snowden (Ashburton)

Youth Olympics

 New Zealand sends a team of 61 competitors.

Births
 10 November – Asterix, Thoroughbred racehorse

Deaths

January
 4 January
 Owen Hardy, World War II fighter pilot (born 1922)
 Gail McIntosh, politician (born 1955)
 5 January
 Barry Thomas, rugby union player (born 1937)
 Peter Wells, high jumper (born 1929)
 7 January
 Jim Anderton, politician (born 1938)
 Buster Stiggs, musician (born 1954)
 12 January – Richard Peterson, fencer, sports administrator (born 1940)
 17 January – Ted McCoy, architect (born 1925)
 21 January – Michael Selby, geomorphologist (born 1936)
 22 January
 Jack Doms, swimmer (born 1927)
 Kevin Tate, soil chemist, climate scientist (born 1943)
 25 January – Graham Williams, rugby union player (born 1945)
 27 January – Grant Fell, musician (born )
 31 January – Pat Booth, journalist (born 1929)

February
 3 February – Ted Corbett, organic chemist (born 1923)
 8 February – Gary Seear, rugby union player (born 1952)
 10 February – Bevan Congdon, cricketer (born 1938)
 11 February – Darien Boswell, rower (born 1938)
 21 February – Beryl Fletcher, novelist (born 1938)
 25 February – Noel Scott, politician (born 1929)
 27 February – Keith Murdoch, rugby union player (born 1943)

March 
 2 March – Gordon Challis, poet (born 1932)
 9 March – Robin Archer, rugby union player and coach (born 1930)
 11 March – Paddy Donovan, boxer, rugby union player (born 1936)
 14 March
Peter Entwisle, art historian (born 1948)
Mac McCallion, rugby union player and coach (born 1950)
 20 March – Dylan Mika, rugby union player (born 1972)
 28 March – Norm Wilson, cricketer (born 1931)

April
 6 April – Colin McLeod, civil engineer (born 1921)
 10 April – Fergie McCormick, rugby union player (born 1939)
 11 April – Robert Matthews, Paralympic athlete (born 1961)
 16 April – Ivan Mauger, motorcycle speedway rider (born 1939)
 23 April – Haddon Donald, soldier, politician (born 1917)
 24 April – Arthur Eustace, athlete, athletics coach and administrator (born 1926)
 25 April – Margo Buchanan-Oliver, marketing academic (born 1952)
 26 April – David Mitchell, architect (born 1941)

May
 2 May – Katherine O'Regan, politician (born 1946)
 4 May – Tony Steel, rugby union player, politician (born 1941)
 9 May
 Norma, Lady Beattie – vice-regal consort (born 1925)
 Carl Perkins, musician (born )
 15 May – Hopeful Christian, founder of Gloriavale Christian Community (born 1926)
 16 May – Tom Hadfield, rugby league player (born 1934)
 19 May – John Moorfield, Māori language academic (born 1943)
 28 May – Dick Quax, athlete, local-body politician (born 1948)

June
 4 June – J. B. Munro, politician, disability advocate (born 1936)
 7 June – Sir Neil Waters, university administrator (born 1931)
 13 June – Milan Mrkusich, artist, designer (born 1925)
 14 June
 Vincent Gray, chemist, climate change denier (born 1922)
 Steve Kuzmicich, statistician (born 1931)
 18 June – Graham Davy, athlete, sports administrator (born 1936)
 23 June – Koro Wētere, politician (born 1935)
 30 June – Mark Irwin, rugby union player (born 1935)

July
 1 July – Merv Richards, pole vaulter, gymnastics and pole vault coach (born 1930)
 3 July – Gary Bold, physicist (born 1938)
 4 July – Harry M. Miller, impresario (born 1934)
 9 July
 Sam Chisholm, media executive (born 1939)
 Colin Quincey, first person to row solo across the Tasman Sea (born 1945)
 13 July – Naturalism, Thoroughbred racehorse (foaled 1988)
 14 July – Janet Holm, environmental activist, historian (born 1923)
 17 July – David Stevens, screenwriter (born 1940)
 25 July – Rick Littlewood, judoka (born 1940)
 29 July
 Graham Finlay, boxer (born 1936)
 Phillip Orchard, rugby league player (born 1948)

August
 2 August – Bob Berry, dendrologist (born 1916)
 3 August
 Reinhart Langer, botanist, university administrator (born 1921)
 Murray Matthewson, orthopaedic surgeon (born 1944)
 4 August – Delwyn Costello, cricketer (born 1960)
 6 August – Helen Mackenzie, swimmer (born 1930)
 17 August – Warwick Roger, journalist, magazine editor (born 1945)
 18 August – Ronnie Moore, speedway rider (born 1933)
 19 August – Margaret Reid, Presbyterian minister (born 1923)
 20 August – Greg Boyed, television presenter (born 1970)
 21 August – Spencer P. Jones, musician (born 1956)
 23 August – Wendy Hutton, travel and food writer (born 1940)
 30 August – Jack Garrick, ichthyologist (born 1928)

September
 5 September
 Alan Peart,  World War II fighter ace (born 1922)
 John Stacpoole, architect, historian (born 1919)
 7 September – John O'Sullivan, rugby league player (born 1950)
 14 September – Ruth Dowman, athlete (born 1930)
 16 September – Assid Corban, politician, businessman (born 1925)
 22 September – Hayden Poulter, convicted murderer (born 1961)
 24 September – Merv Smith, radio personality (born 1933)

October
 2 October – Barry Linton, cartoonist (born 1947)
 3 October – David Fergusson, psychologist (born 1944)
 4 October
 Penny Bright, activist (born 1954)
 Barrie Frost, psychologist, neuroscientist (born )
 6 October – Wilf Malcolm, mathematician, university administrator (born 1933)
 13 October – Bob Doran, computer scientist (born 1944)
 14 October – Tom Delahunty, association football referee (born 1935)
 17 October
 Denis Adam, arts patron (born 1924)
 Sir Ngātata Love, academic, Te Āti Awa leader (born 1937)
 Sir Thomas Thorp, jurist (born 1925)
 19 October – Sir John McGrath, jurist (born 1945)
 24 October – Keith Hunter, marine and freshwater chemist (born 1951)
 27 October – Murray Khouri, clarinetist (born 1941)
 29 October
 Peter Hawes, playwright, novelist, and scriptwriter (born 1947)
 June Kerr, ballerina (born 1932)
 31 October
 Sir Thomas Eichelbaum, jurist (born 1931)
 Maurice Mahoney, architect (born 1929)

November
 4 November – Tama Renata, musician
 6 November – Gordon Whiting, jurist (born 1942)
 13 November – Sir John Anderson, businessman, sports administrator (born 1945)
 14 November – Douglas Wright, dancer, choreographer (born 1956)
 18 November – Peter Peryer, photographer (born 1941)
 19 November – Neil Collins, broadcaster, local-body politician (born 1941)
 20 November – Cyril Belshaw, anthropologist (born 1921)
 24 November – Gordon Copeland, politician (born 1943)
 28 November – Georgie Salter, netball player and coach (born )

December
 1 December – Vivian Lynn, artist (born 1931)
 2 December – William Smith, naval officer (born 1922)
 3 December – Geoff Murphy, film director and screenwriter (born 1938)
 5 December – John Armstrong, politician (born 1935)
 6 December – Robin Clark, chemist (born 1935)
 11 December
 Winifred Griffin, swimmer (born 1932)
 Hiwi Tauroa, rugby union player and coach, Race Relations Conciliator (born 1927)
 20 December
 Randall Carrington, cricketer (born 1934)
 Trevor Chinn, glaciologist (born 1937)
 21 December – Fay Gock, horticulturalist (born 1933)
 25 December – Bill Baillie, athlete (born 1934)
 30 December – Harry Atkinson, physicist, science administrator (born 1929)

References

 
2010s in New Zealand
Years of the 21st century in New Zealand
New Zealand
New Zealand